Courter is an unincorporated community in Jefferson Township, Miami County, in the U.S. state of Indiana.

History
Courter was platted in 1869 by R. F. Donaldson. The community was named after the Courter family of settlers.

Courter had a depot on the Lake Erie and Western Railroad. At one time, the town contained a general store, a blacksmith shop, and a public school. A post office was established at Courter in 1869, and remained in operation until it was discontinued in 1896.

References

Unincorporated communities in Miami County, Indiana
Unincorporated communities in Indiana